Jukebox the Ghost is the fourth studio album by American power pop band, Jukebox the Ghost. The album was released on October 21, 2014, by Yep Roc Records.

Track listing

Reception 
Writing for USA Today, Brian Mansfield wrote on "The Great Unknown", commenting that "robust piano chords and a chorus of voices lend a gospel-like buoyancy to this song about greeting life's challenges."

Charts

References 

2014 albums
Jukebox the Ghost albums
Yep Roc Records albums